Novi Sad City League (Serbian: Градска лига Нови Сад; Gradska liga Novi Sad) is one of the 52 Intermunicipal football league in Serbia. Inter-municipal league as a sixth level league football competition in Serbia. In league clubs compete with area of Novi Sad, Beočin and Temerin, which is managed by the Football Association of the City of Novi Sad. The league has 18 teams. Champion goes directly or through a barrage of GPFL Novi Sad.

Champions history

See also
Serbian SuperLiga
Serbian First League
Serbian League
Vojvodina League West
Serbian Zone League
GPFL Novi Sad

External links
 
 Results and Table „Novi Sad Football League“ www.srbijasport.net

6
Football in Vojvodina